"Dark Side" is a song by Finnish post-hardcore band Blind Channel. It represented Finland in the Eurovision Song Contest 2021, having won Uuden Musiikin Kilpailu 2021. It reached number one in Finland on 28 February 2021.

The song was nominated at the 2021 Global Metal Apocalypse Awards, where it finished joint 9th.

Eurovision Song Contest

The song was selected to represent Finland in the Eurovision Song Contest 2021, after winning Uuden Musiikin Kilpailu 2021, the music competition that selects Finland's entries for the Eurovision Song Contest. The semi-finals of the 2021 contest featured the same line-up of countries as determined by the draw for the 2020 contest's semi-finals. Finland was placed into the second semi-final, held on 20 May 2021, and performed in the second half of the show. The song finished in 6th position in the Grand Final with 301 points.

Charts

References

2021 songs
Eurovision songs of 2021
Eurovision songs of Finland
Nu metal songs
Rap rock songs
Finnish rock songs
Number-one singles in Finland

Blind Channel songs